West Liberty is a borough in Butler County, Pennsylvania, United States. The population was 343 at the 2010 census.

Geography
West Liberty is located in northwestern Butler County at  (41.009509, -80.059073). It is bordered to the east and south by Brady Township, to the west by Worth Township, and to the north by Slippery Rock Township. The borough includes the main settlement of West Liberty in the valley of Hogue Run but extends north as far as Slippery Rock Creek.

Demographics

As of the census of 2000, there were 325 people, 118 households, and 92 families residing in the borough. The population density was 83.1 people per square mile (32.1/km2). There were 123 housing units at an average density of 31.4 per square mile (12.1/km2). The racial makeup of the borough was 99.38% White, 0.31% Asian, and 0.31% from two or more races.

There were 118 households, out of which 31.4% had children under the age of 18 living with them, 66.9% were married couples living together, 5.1% had a female householder with no husband present, and 22.0% were non-families. 16.9% of all households were made up of individuals, and 8.5% had someone living alone who was 65 years of age or older. The average household size was 2.75 and the average family size was 3.07.

In the borough the population was spread out, with 24.3% under the age of 18, 9.2% from 18 to 24, 28.6% from 25 to 44, 26.5% from 45 to 64, and 11.4% who were 65 years of age or older. The median age was 36 years. For every 100 females there were 115.2 males. For every 100 females age 18 and over, there were 117.7 males.

The median income for a household in the borough was $45,446, and the median income for a family was $46,354. Males had a median income of $32,813 versus $19,167 for females. The per capita income for the borough was $17,133. About 2.9% of families and 6.2% of the population were below the poverty line, including 7.5% of those under age 18 and none of those age 65 or over.

References

Populated places established in 1829
Boroughs in Butler County, Pennsylvania